The Fugue in G minor is a musical composition, possibly for the lute, written by Johann Sebastian Bach shortly after he moved from Köthen to Leipzig in 1723.

Today the piece is typically played on the guitar.

Origin 
Bach extracted the second movement from his Sonata No. 1 in G minor for solo violin, BWV 1001, written in 1720, and rewrote it; it is not clear that it was intended for the lute. No definitive manuscript version exists today, although there is a contemporary copy in tablature, possibly made by Bach's lutenist friend, Christian Weyrauch.

See also 
Prelude in C minor, BWV 999

References 

G minor
Compositions for lute